"Granite State" is the fifteenth and the penultimate episode of the fifth season of the American television crime drama series Breaking Bad, and the 61st and penultimate episode of the series. The episode was directed and written by Peter Gould. It aired on AMC in the United States and Canada on September 22, 2013.

Plot 
Ed Galbraith brings Saul Goodman to his vacuum repair shop, where Walter White also awaits a new identity.  Walt attempts to coerce Saul into coming with him but is subdued by a coughing fit. No longer intimidated by Walt, Saul leaves for his new life in Nebraska.

Jack Welker's gang raids Marie Schrader's house and finds Jesse Pinkman's confession tape. Jack wants to kill Jesse for informing, but Todd Alquist wants Jesse to cook meth to impress Lydia Rodarte-Quayle, with whom Todd is infatuated. Knowing Skyler White once met Lydia, Todd and other gang members break into Skyler's house and threaten her to keep quiet. Lydia is not convinced Skyler will stay silent, and aims to end their meth operation, but reconsiders after Todd informs her that the meth the gang produces is now at 92% purity because of Jesse. Jesse escapes but is recaptured. Todd forces Jesse to watch as he kills Andrea Cantillo. Jack threatens to kill Brock Cantillo if Jesse attempts another escape.

Ed takes Walt to a secluded cabin in New Hampshire and says he will visit monthly to bring food and supplies. He cautions that Walt risks capture if he leaves the cabin. Months later, a disheveled, lonely and remorseful Walt has a full beard and head of hair. Ed tells Walt that Skyler is using her maiden name and working part-time as a taxi dispatcher. A nationwide manhunt for Walt continues and his abandoned house has become something of a tourist attraction.

Walt packs $100,000 into a box and walks into town. He stops at the local bar and pays a barmaid to call Walter White Jr.'s school pretending to be Marie. Walt tries reconciling with Walter Jr., who has changed his name to Flynn after Walt fled Albuquerque, and says he will mail money to Flynn's friend Louis for Flynn to give Skyler. An enraged Flynn blames Walt for Hank Schrader's death and wishes Walt dead. Dejected, Walt calls the DEA to surrender and leaves the phone off the hook so they can trace his location.

While waiting for the police to arrive, Walt sees on the bar's T.V. that Gretchen and Elliott Schwartz are being interviewed by Charlie Rose. They minimize his contributions to Gray Matter Technologies, which angers him. Motivated by his anger, Walt flees before the police arrive.

Production 

On September 18, 2013, it was announced that both "Granite State" and "Felina" would run for 75 minutes including 22 minutes of commercials. The episode title refers to the nickname of New Hampshire, which is where Walt is relocated upon being given a new identity. Parts of the phone call of Walt and Walt Jr. needed to be reshot, because during the transport an airplane rolled over the film.

This episode marks the final appearance of Bob Odenkirk as a series regular, as his character, Saul Goodman, flees to Nebraska. Odenkirk returned as Saul in the spin-off prequel to Breaking Bad entitled Better Call Saul. In the episode, Saul tells Walt, "If I'm lucky, a month from now, best-case scenario, I'm managing a Cinnabon in Omaha." Gould said this was simply a throwaway line as Better Call Saul had not yet been conceptualized, but once that series was greenlit, it was decided to show in the flash-forward of the series premiere that Saul has indeed become a Cinnabon manager in Omaha, Nebraska.

To film the part where Charlie Rose interviews Gretchen Schwartz and Elliott Schwartz, the crew emailed one of Charlie Rose's producers, then received a reply from Charlie Rose directly: "I love your show, and I love Vince Gilligan."

The chronology of events immediately prior to and during this episode were further explored via flashback scenes in the 2019 sequel film El Camino: A Breaking Bad Movie, and in three episodes of the aforementioned spin-off series Better Call Saul (these being Season 4's "Quite a Ride", Season 6's "Wine and Roses", and the series finale "Saul Gone").

Reception 
The episode was watched by 6.58 million viewers on its original broadcast.

The episode was critically acclaimed, with reviewers commenting on how the slower change of pace from the previous week's episode "Ozymandias" allowed for a more contemplative narrative.

Accolades 

This episode was nominated for two Creative Arts Emmy Awards, Michael Slovis was nominated for Outstanding Cinematography for a Single-Camera Series (One Hour), while Kelley Dixon and Chris McCaleb were nominated for Outstanding Single-Camera Picture Editing for a Drama Series, losing to Skip Macdonald for Felina.

Peter Gould was nominated for the Writers Guild of America Award for Television: Episodic Drama for this episode.

Robert Forster's guest performance earned him the Saturn Award for Best Guest Starring Role on Television.

The Ringer ranked "Granite State" as the 7th best out of the 62 total Breaking Bad episodes.

Notes

References

Further reading

External links 
"Granite State" at the official Breaking Bad site

2013 American television episodes
Breaking Bad (season 5) episodes
Television episodes written by Peter Gould